Sanyasi Raja is a Bengali drama film directed by Piyush Bose and produced by Asim Sarkar. This film was released on 3 October 1975 in the banner of Usha Films and is based on the real life incident of the Bhawal case. The film starred Uttam Kumar and Supriya Devi in lead role. The noted music of this film composed by Nachiketa Ghosh. The film was remade in Telugu in 1977 as Raja Ramesh.

Plot
Zamindar Surya Kishore never looks after his family and estate. Doctor Bijoy Chakraborty is a family friend of Surya and lives in the same house. He plans to kill Surya and forces Surya's wife Indu to keep quiet. In a burning ghat, a monk saves the life of Surya, but, back at his home, he finds that his whole property is already occupied by Dr Bijoy. Surya Kishore now plans to recover his lost estate.

Cast
 Uttam Kumar as Surya Kishore
 Supriya Choudhury as Indu
 Satya Bandopadhyay as Thomas
 Rabin Banerjee as Dr. Bijay
 Shambhu Bhattacharya as Nitai
 Sulata Chowdhury
 Kalyani Adhikari
 Sunil Bandyopadhyay

Soundtrack

Reception
Times Of India wrote "This is perhaps one of the most intense Bengali film that have ever been made on real life story. Not only this movie famous for Uttam Kumar's outstanding performance, but it's also a well known Indian court case known as the Bhawal Case."

Award
Bengal Film Journalists Association Award 1976
1976 : Bengal Film Journalists Association Best Lyricist Award - Gauri Prasanna Mazumder

Remake
The film remade in Telugu as Raja Ramesh in 1977 where the famous Telugu star ANR starred in the lead role. In 2018 National Award winner director Srijit Mukherji made another film Ek Je Chhilo Raja based on Bhawal case of which the story line is related to some extent. Jisshu Sengupta played the role of Raja Ramendra Kumar Roy Chowdhury.

References

External links
 

Indian drama films
1975 drama films
Bengali-language Indian films
Bengali films remade in other languages
Films scored by Nachiketa Ghosh
1970s Bengali-language films
Indian films based on actual events